Wake Up is the second studio album by British pop band the Vamps. It was released on 27 November 2015. It debuted and peaked at number 10 on the UK Albums Chart and has been certified Gold.

Singles
"Wake Up" was released on 2 October 2015 as the album's lead single.
"Rest Your Love" was released as the second single of the album on 27 November 2015.
"I Found a Girl" was announced as the third single of the album and was released on 1 April 2016. The Vamps also announced on their Twitter that there would be a new version of the song featuring a surprise artist. They later confirmed the featuring artist would be OMI. The original version of the song had been previously released as a promotional single on 23 November 2015.

Promotional singles
"Cheater" was released as the first countdown single of the album on 13 October 2015. A promotional video was also released in the same day on the band's Vevo account.
"Stolen Moments" was released as the second countdown single of the album on 4 November 2015 along with a lyric video on their YouTube channel.

World tour
The Wake Up World Tour began in January 2016 and passed across 18 countries in 4 continents. The support acts include The Tide (all dates), Hometown (UK and Ireland), Conor Maynard (UK), New Hope Club (UK and Ireland), Tyde Levi (Australia), Little Sea (Australia), At Sunset (Australia) Before You Exit (Philippines), William Singe (Philippines), and Jayda Avanzado (Philippines)

Track listing

Notes
Credits adapted from album liner notes
 signifies an additional producer

Personnel 
Credits adapted from the liner notes of Wake Up (Deluxe Version).

The Vamps
 Bradley Simpson - lead and backing vocals (all tracks)
 Connor Ball - bass guitar, backing vocals, lead vocals (1, 17-18)
 James McVey - lead guitar, backing vocals, lead vocals (track 2)
 Tristan Evans - drums, backing vocals

Performers
 Ammar Malik – additional backing vocals (1, 3, 5, 8)
 Ross Golan – additional backing vocals (1, 7)
 Steve Mac – additional backing vocals (1), keyboards (1, 3, 5, 7, 8), strings (3)
 Paul Gendler – guitar (1, 7, 8), additional guitar (3, 5)
 Chris Laws – additional drums (1, 3, 5, 7, 8)
 Carl Falk – guitars (2), programming (2), additional backing vocals (2)
 Rami Yacoub – bass (2), programming (2), additional backing vocals (2)
 Savan Kotecha – additional backing vocals (2)
 Tobias Karlsson  – keyboards (12), programming (12), guitar (12), bass (12)
 Shellback – additional backing vocals (2)
 Thrice Noble – additional programming (12)
 Kristoffer Fogelmark – additional backing vocals (2)
 Albin Nedler – additional backing vocals (2)
 Wayne Hector – additional backing vocals (3)
 Silento – vocals (3)
 Alex Smith – keyboards (4), programming (4)
 Matt Furmidge – keyboards (4), programming (4)
 Jay Reynolds – keyboards (9, 15, 17), programming (9, 15, 17)
 Rick Parkhouse – percussion (11, 14)
 George Tizzard – percussion (11, 14), keyboards (11, 14)
 Johan Carlsson – keyboards (12), programming (12)
 Matt Prime – programming (13)
 Phil Cook – additional programming (6)
Production and recording
 Steve Mac – production (1, 3, 5, 7, 8)
 Ammar Malik – production (1)
 Kevin Snevely – production (1)
 Daniel Pursey – engineering (1, 3, 5, 7, 8)
 Chris Laws – engineering (1, 3, 5, 7, 8), mixing (5, 7, 8)
 John Hanes – assistant mix engineering (1, 2, 3, 12)
 Serban Ghenea – mixing (1, 2, 3, 12)
 Carl Falk – production (2)
 Rami Yacoub – production (2)
 Thomas Cullison – engineering (2)
 Metrophonic – production (4)
 Alex Smith – engineering (4)
 Matt Furmidge – engineering (4)
 Dom Liu – engineering (4)
 Michael Brauer – engineering (4)
 Matt Prime – production (6, 13), mixing (6, 13)
 Phil Cook – additional production (13)
 Joe Zook – mixing (10)
 Jay Reynolds – production (9, 15, 17), mixing (9, 15, 17, 18)
 Red Triangle – production (10, 11, 14), mixing (11, 14)
 Rick Parkhouse – engineering (11, 14)
 Chester Barrett – engineering (11, 14)
 Tobias Karlsson – production (12)
 Noah Passovoy – vocal production (12), engineering (12)
 Tristan Evans – production (16), mixing (16)
 Connor Ball – production (18)

Charts and certifications

Charts

Certifications

Release formats
Standard edition
12 tracks

Deluxe edition
18 tracks

Limited edition (unavailable after Christmas 2015, only available with the world tour merchandising)
CD – 18 tracks
DVD: The Vamps Live at The O2 Arena

Limited Access All Areas edition
CD – 18 tracks
DVD: The Vamps Live at The O2 Arena
Digital download – 18 tracks
Unique online experience
Curated music videos
Social stream news updates
Interactive booklet
Lyric poster
Art cards

Release history

References

2015 albums
The Vamps (British band) albums